Thomas, Tom, or Tommy Nelson may refer to:

Politics and government
Thomas Nelson Jr. (1738–1789), American Revolutionary War leader; signer of Declaration of Independence; governor of Virginia (1781)
Thomas M. Nelson (1782–1853), American congressman from Virginia
Thomas Amos Rogers Nelson (1812–1873), American congressman from Tennessee
Thomas Nelson (Oregon judge) (1819–1907), Chief Justice of Oregon Supreme Court, 1850–1853
Thomas G. Nelson (1936–2011), federal judge to the United States Court of Appeals for the Ninth Circuit
Thomas H. Nelson (1824–1896), American diplomat during and after the Civil War
Thomas Leverett Nelson (1827–1897), American judge
Tom Nelson (Wisconsin politician) (born 1976), American politician
Tom Nelson (South Dakota politician) (born 1957) - see List of members of the South Dakota State Senate
Thomas Nelson (Northern Ireland politician) (1888–1954), Northern Irish politician, for Enniskillen

Sports
Tommy Nelson (baseball) (1917–1973), American baseball infielder
Tom Nelson (American football player) (born 1986), American football player
Tom Nelson (American football coach), American football coach in the United States
Tom Nelson (Australian footballer) (1883–1957), Australian rules footballer
Thomas Arthur Nelson (1876–1917), Scottish rugby player

Other fields
Thomas "Scotch Tom" Nelson (1677–1747), Scottish immigrant and merchant to America in the Colony of Virginia
Thomas Nelson, 2nd Earl Nelson (1786–1835), English nobleman who was a nephew of Admiral Horatio Nelson
Thomas Nelson, 4th Earl Nelson (1857–1947), British peer
Thomas C. Nelson (born 1961/62), American businessman, chairman and CEO of National Gypsum
Thomas D. Nelson, Sr. (1895–2007), African-American shopkeeper (from Texas) who lived six months past his 111th birthday
Tommy Nelson (actor) (born 1997), American actor
Thomas Nelson (1822–1892), Scottish businessman and inventor of an improved rotary printing press
Thomas Marsh Nelson (1810s–1884), English architect
Thomas Hudson Nelson (1856–1916), British ornithologist

Other uses
 Thomas Nelson (publisher), a Scottish publishing firm
 Thomas Nelson Community College, Virginia
 Thomas Nelson High School, Nelson County, Kentucky